The Souris–Red–Rainy region is one of 21 major geographic areas, or regions, in the first level of classification used by the United States Geological Survey to divide and sub-divide the United States into successively smaller hydrologic units. These geographic areas contain either the drainage area of a major river, or the combined drainage areas of a series of rivers.

This region includes the drainage within the United States of the Lake of the Woods and the Rainy, Red, and Souris River Basins that ultimately discharges into Lake Winnipeg and Hudson Bay. Includes parts of Minnesota, North Dakota, and South Dakota.

List of water resource subregions

See also 
 List of rivers in the United States
 Water resource region

References 

Regions of the United States
Drainage basins
Watersheds of the United States

Water resource regions